Aplopsora is a genus of rust fungi in the Chaconiaceae family. The genus contains about six species.

References

External links

Pucciniales
Taxa named by Edwin Butterworth Mains